= Spanish Fidelist Group of Cuba =

Spanish Fidelist Group of Cuba (Spanish: Grupo Fidelista Español de Cuba) was a group of Spanish leftwing exiles in Cuba. The group existed in the early 1960s.

The group published Lucha revolucionaria.
